The 2007 Tour of Chongming Island Stage race was the first women's edition of the Tour of Chongming Island cycling stage race. It was rated by the UCI as category 2.1, and was held between 3 and 6 June 2007, in China.

Stages

Stage 1
3 June 2007 – Renshou Yatong City, Criterium

Stage 2
4 June 2007 – Chongxi to Chongxi,

Stage 3
5 June 2007 – Chongbei to Chongbei,

Stage 4
6 June 2007 – Chongdong to Chongdong,

Final classifications

General classification

Source is cyclingarchives.com

Points Classification

Source is cyclingarchives.com

Team Classification

Source is cyclingarchives.com

See also
 2007 Tour of Chongming Island Time trial
 2007 in women's road cycling

References

External links
2007 official website
Tour of Chongming Island website

Tour of Chongming Island
Tour of Chongming Island
2007 in Chinese sport